

Results

F32

Athletics at the 2016 Summer Paralympics